Gabriela Potorac (born 6 February 1973) is a Romanian former artistic gymnast. At the 1988 Summer Olympics in Seoul, she won three medals: a team silver, a silver on vault with a score of 19.830, and a bronze on balance beam with a score of 19.837. At the 1989 World Championships, she won the bronze medal on balance beam with a score of 9.887.

After retiring from competitions Potorac studied at the Sports University in Bucharest and coached at the club Triumf. In 1993 she moved to Japan to work as a gymnastics coach and married there. She later divorced, but stayed in Japan, working as a coach and occasional Japanese-Romanian translator.

References

External links

 
 
 
 

1973 births
Living people
Sportspeople from Bacău
Romanian female artistic gymnasts
Gymnasts at the 1988 Summer Olympics
Olympic gymnasts of Romania
Olympic silver medalists for Romania
Olympic bronze medalists for Romania
Olympic medalists in gymnastics
Medalists at the World Artistic Gymnastics Championships
European champions in gymnastics
Medalists at the 1988 Summer Olympics
20th-century Romanian women